Marquess of Huntly (traditionally spelled Marquis in Scotland; Scottish Gaelic: Coileach Strath Bhalgaidh) is a title in the Peerage of Scotland that was created on 17 April 1599 for George Gordon, 6th Earl of Huntly. It is the oldest existing marquessate in Scotland, and the second-oldest in the British Isles; only the English marquessate of Winchester is older. The Marquess holds the following subsidiary titles: Lord Gordon of Strathaven and Glenlivet and Earl of Aboyne (1660; Peerage of Scotland), and Baron Meldrum, of Morven in the County of Aberdeen (1815; Peerage of the United Kingdom).

Early family history
The Gordon family descends from Sir Adam Gordon of Huntly, killed at the Battle of Humbleton Hill in 1402 and succeeded in his estates by his daughter Elizabeth Gordon, wife of Alexander Seton, who assumed the surname of Gordon for himself and "all his heirs male." He was created Earl of Huntly in the Peerage of Scotland in 1445 and was succeeded by his son, the second Earl, who served as Lord Chancellor of Scotland from 1498 to 1501. His younger son, the Hon. Adam Gordon, married Elizabeth, suo jure Countess of Sutherland. Their grandson, John Gordon, succeeded his grandmother in the earldom in 1535 (see Earl of Sutherland for further history about this branch of the family).

Lord Huntly's elder son, the third Earl, was a member of the Council of Regency in 1517. He was succeeded by his grandson, the fourth Earl, Lord Chancellor of Scotland from 1546 to 1562, who was killed in the latter year, and in 1563 an Act of Attainder was passed through Parliament with all his titles forfeited. His eldest surviving son, George Gordon, was condemned to death for treason in 1563 but later pardoned. He obtained a reversal of his father's attainder in 1567 and served as Lord Chancellor of Scotland. 

George Gordon, became the 1st Marquess, he was the son of the 5th earl; born in 1562, educated in France as a Roman Catholic. He was part of a plot to conspire aganist King James VI. He worked as captain of the guard of Holyrood before the discovery of treason. He went about clan feuds and started a private war, this inspired the ballad The Bonnie Earl O' Moray. He was succeeded by his son. Earl of Enzie and Marquess of Huntly in the Peerage of Scotland.  His son was raised protestant in England; in the civil war he became a royalist and in 1647 was given a pardon for his actions, yet later beheaded. He was succeeded by his elder son, the second Marquess.

17th century onward
In 1632, four years before his father's death, the sixth Earl was created Viscount Aboyne in the Peerage of Scotland in his own right, with remainder that the title should be passed on to his second son the Hon. James Gordon on his death or on the death of his father, whichever came first.

When he died two years later the titles passed to his son, the fourth Marquess. In 1661 the attainder of 1649 was revoked by Act of Parliament. In 1684 Lord Huntly was created Lord Badenoch, Lochaber, Strathavon, Balmore, Auchindoun, Garthie and Kincardine, Viscount of Inverness, Earl of Huntly and Enzie and Duke of Gordon. All four titles were in the Peerage of Scotland. He was succeeded by his son, the second Duke. He was a supporter of the Old Pretender. Gordon married Lady Henrietta, daughter of Charles Mordaunt, 3rd Earl of Peterborough and 8th Baron Mordaunt. Their eldest son, the third Duke, sat in the House of Lords as a Scottish Representative Peer from 1747 to 1752. He was succeeded by his eldest son, the fourth Duke. Known as "Cock o' the North", he was a Scottish Representative Peer from 1767 to 1784 and served as Lord-Lieutenant of Aberdeenshire and as Keeper of the Great Seal of Scotland. In 1784 he was created Baron Gordon of Huntley, in the County of Gloucester, and Earl of Norwich, in the County of Norfolk, in the Peerage of Great Britain. Gordon's great-grandfather, the first Duke, was the husband of Lady Elizabeth Howard, daughter of Lord Henry Howard, who had been created Baron Howard of Castle Rising in 1669 and Earl of Norwich in 1672. The earldom of Norwich had become extinct on the death of the fourth Earl (also the ninth Duke of Norfolk) in 1777 and was now revived in Gordon's favour. In 1819 Gordon also inherited the barony of Mordaunt through his grandmother.

His son, the fifth Duke, was a general in the Army and served as Lord-Lieutenant of Aberdeenshire and as Keeper of the Great Seal of Scotland. In 1807 he was summoned to the House of Lords through a writ of acceleration in his father's junior title of Baron Gordon of Huntley. Gordon died without legitimate issue in 1836 when the dukedom and remaining titles created in 1684 as well as the titles created in 1784 became extinct. The barony of Mordaunt fell into abeyance between his sisters. Gordon's eldest sister, Lady Charlotte Gordon, inherited the Gordon estates. Her son Charles Gordon-Lennox, 5th Duke of Richmond, assumed the additional surname of Gordon. In 1875, the dukedom of Gordon was revived when his son Charles Henry Gordon-Lennox, 6th Duke of Richmond, was made Duke of Gordon in the Peerage of the United Kingdom (see the Duke of Richmond for further history of these titles). The Duke of Gordon was succeeded in the marquessate of Huntly by his kinsman George Gordon, 5th Earl of Aboyne, who became the ninth Marquess (see the Earl of Aboyne for earlier history of this branch of the family). However, the House of Lords did not allow his claims to the lordship of Gordon of Badenoch and earldom of Enzie (although they had been created at the same time as the marquessate) while his claim to the ancient earldom of Huntly was also overlooked. Lord Huntly, who also held the subsidiary title of Lord Gordon of Strahaven and Glenlivet, had earlier been a Scottish Representative Peer from 1796 to 1807. In 1815 he had been created Baron Meldrum, of Morven in the County of Aberdeen, in the Peerage of the United Kingdom.

He was succeeded by his son, the tenth Marquess. He represented East Grinstead and Huntingdonshire in the House of Commons and served as Lord-Lieutenant of Aberdeenshire. His eldest son, the eleventh Marquess, was a Liberal politician and served briefly under William Ewart Gladstone as Captain of the Honourable Corps of Gentlemen-at-Arms in 1881. He was succeeded by his great-nephew, the twelfth Marquess. He was the son of Lieutenant-Colonel (Granville Cecil) Douglas Gordon (1883–1930), son of Granville Armyn Gordon (1856–1907), sixth son of the tenth Marquess.  the titles are held by the twelfth Marquess' son, Granville Charles Gomer Gordon, 13th Marquess of Huntly, 9th Earl of Aboyne, 9th Lord Gordon of Strathavon and Glenlivet and 5th Baron Meldrum, who succeeded in 1987. He is Chief of Clan Gordon.

Before the passing of the Peerage Act 1963, which granted all Scottish peers a seat in the House of Lords, the Marquesses of Huntly sat in the House of Lords in virtue of their junior title of Baron Meldrum, which was in the Peerage of the United Kingdom.

Other family members
Several other members of the Gordon family have also gained distinction. Lord John Gordon, younger son of the first Marquess, was created Viscount Melgum in 1627. Lord Adam Gordon (died 1801), younger son of the second Duke, was a general in the Army. Lord William Gordon (1744–1823), second son of the third Duke, was a vice-admiral in the Royal Navy. Lord George Gordon, third and youngest son of the third Duke, sat as Member of Parliament for Ludgershall but is best remembered as the instigator of the Gordon Riots. Charles Gordon (1798–1878), illegitimate son of the fifth Duke, was an admiral in the Royal Navy. Lord John Frederick Gordon (1799–1878), third son of the ninth Marquess, was an admiral in the Royal Navy. He married Lady Augusta Fitzclarence, daughter of King William IV by his mistress Dorothy Jordan. Laurence George Frank Gordon (1864–1943), grandson of Lieutenant-Colonel Lord Francis Arthur Gordon (1808–1857), sixth son of the ninth Marquess, was a brigadier-general in the Army. Lord Douglas Gordon, fourth son of the tenth Marquess, was Member of Parliament for Huntingdon.

The family seat is Aboyne Castle. The family also previously owned Huntly Castle, Huntly, Aberdeenshire.

Earls of Huntly (1445)

Alexander Gordon, 1st Earl of Huntly (died 1470)
George Gordon, 2nd Earl of Huntly (died 1501)
Alexander Gordon, 3rd Earl of Huntly (died 1524)
George Gordon, 4th Earl of Huntly (1514–1562) (forfeit 1563)
George Gordon, 5th Earl of Huntly (died 1576) (restored 1565)
George Gordon, 6th Earl of Huntly (1562–1636) (created Marquess of Huntly, Lord Gordon of Badenoch, and Earl of Enzie in 1599)

Marquesses of Huntly (1599)
George Gordon, 1st Marquess of Huntly, 6th Earl of Huntly (1562–1636)
George Gordon, 2nd Marquess of Huntly, 7th Earl of Huntly (1592–1649)
Lewis Gordon, 3rd Marquess of Huntly, 8th Earl of Huntly (c. 1626–1653)
George Gordon, 4th Marquess of Huntly, 9th Earl of Huntly (1649–1716) (created Duke of Gordon in 1684)

Dukes of Gordon (1684)
George Gordon, 1st Duke of Gordon, 4th Marquess of Huntly, 9th Earl of Huntly (1649–1716)
Alexander Gordon, 2nd Duke of Gordon, 5th Marquess of Huntly, 10th Earl of Huntly (died 1728)
Cosmo George Gordon, 3rd Duke of Gordon, 6th Marquess of Huntly, 11th Earl of Huntly (c. 1720–1752)
Alexander Gordon, 4th Duke of Gordon, 7th Marquess of Huntly, 12th Earl of Huntly (1743–1827)
George Duncan Gordon, 5th Duke of Gordon, 8th Marquess of Huntly, 13th Earl of Huntly (1770–1836)

Marquesses of Huntly (1599; Reverted)
George Gordon, 9th Marquess of Huntly, 14th Earl of Huntly, 5th Earl of Aboyne, 1st Baron Meldrum (1761–1853) (Created Baron Meldrum in 1815)
Charles Gordon, 10th Marquess of Huntly, 15th Earl of Huntly, 6th Earl of Aboyne, 2nd Baron Meldrum (1792–1863)
Charles Gordon, 11th Marquess of Huntly, 16th Earl of Huntly, 7th Earl of Aboyne, 3rd Baron Meldrum (1847–1937)
Douglas Charles Lindsey Gordon, 12th Marquess of Huntly, 17th Earl of Huntly, 8th Earl of Aboyne, 4th Baron Meldrum (1908–1987)
Granville Charles Gomer Gordon, 13th Marquess of Huntly, 18th Earl of Huntly, 9th Earl of Aboyne, 5th Baron Meldrum (born 1944)

The heir apparent is the present holder's only son, Alastair Gordon, Earl of Aboyne (born 1973).
The heir apparent's heir apparent is his son Cosmo Alistair Gordon, Lord Strathavon (born 2009).

Family tree

See also
Clan Gordon
Earl of Aboyne
Viscount Aboyne
Viscount Melgum
Baron Mordaunt
Duke of Gordon
Seton Baronets
Duke of Richmond
Earl of Sutherland
Meldrum
Morven, Aberdeenshire
Marquess of Aberdeen and Temair

References

Notes

Sources

External links

, Aaron McGregor, violin; Alice Allen, cello, Concerto Caledonia directed by David McGuinness

 

Marquessates in the Peerage of Scotland
House of Gordon
Noble titles created in 1599